Mexico participated in the 2010 Winter Olympics in Vancouver, British Columbia, Canada, after not having any competitors in the 2006 competition. Mexico first competed in the Winter Olympics in 1928, but then not again until 1984. No Mexican athlete has yet won a medal in the Winter Olympics.

Alpine skiing 

Hubertus von Hohenlohe represented Mexico in the men's slalom. Hohenlohe previously competed in 1984, 1988, 1992 and 1994. A descendant of German and Austrian royalty, and also Mexican nobility on his father's maternal side, he founded Mexico's skiing federation in 1981. He qualified for the 2006 Olympics, but Mexico decided not to participate because no other Mexicans had qualified. He has competed in 12 alpine world championships. Hohenlohe broke his leg in 2007, forcing him to miss a record 13th world championship. At the time of the competition, Hohenlohe was 51 years old.

See also
 Mexico at the 2010 Winter Paralympics

References

External links
 Mexico at NBC Olympics

Oly
Nations at the 2010 Winter Olympics
2010